Sound Drop MTV Unplugged+Acoustic Live 2005 is a live album by Hitomi Yaida. Released in 2005, it peaked at No. 29 on the Japanese albums charts.

CD track listing (MTV Unplugged)

DVD track listing (Acoustic Live 2005)

References

Hitomi Yaida albums
MTV Unplugged albums
2005 live albums
2005 video albums
Live video albums
Hitomi Yaida video albums